Philip Lawrence Samis (December 28, 1927 – January 11, 2022) was an ice hockey defenceman. He played two regular season games in the National Hockey League during the 1949–50 season and five playoff games in 1948, when he won the Stanley Cup, all with the Toronto Maple Leafs. The rest of his career, which lasted from 1947 to 1953, was mainly spent in the American Hockey League. Samis was the last surviving member of the Maple Leafs 1948 Stanley Cup team.

Playing career

Junior career
Samis started out playing minor hockey in his hometown for the Edmonton Maple Leafs in 1943–44. The next season, he moved to Toronto to attend St. Michael's College and play for the St. Michael's Majors. He helped the team win the 1945 Memorial Cup. Along the way he played with future NHLers like Les Costello, Johnny McCormack, Jim Morrison, Gus Mortson, Tod Sloan and Jimmy Thomson. He was coached by Hockey Hall of Famer Joe Primeau. He would spend the next two seasons with the Oshawa Generals of the OHA.

Professional career
He turned professional in 1948 signing a contract with the Toronto Maple Leafs. He was assigned to the Pittsburgh Hornets of the AHL. He was called up to the NHL for the playoff run that spring. He played 5 games for the Maple Leafs helping them win the 1948 Stanley Cup. He was sent back to Pittsburgh at the start of the 1949 season. He did not return to the NHL until 1950 when he was called up for 2 games as an injury replacement. After that he spent the rest of his career playing in the AHL for the Pittsburgh Hornets and the Cleveland Barons. He helped Cleveland win the Calder Cup in 1951. He retired from hockey in 1953. He briefly came out of retirement and played one season for the Montreal Royals of the QSHL.

Later life and death
After his retirement, Samis became a dentist, studying at McGill University. He died in Greater Napanee, Ontario on January 11, 2022, at the age of 94.

Career statistics

Regular season and playoffs

References

External links
 
 Phil Samis' Day with the Stanley Cup

1927 births
2022 deaths
Canadian dentists
Canadian ice hockey defencemen
Cleveland Barons (1937–1973) players
Ice hockey people from Edmonton
McGill University alumni
Montreal Royals (QSHL) players
Pittsburgh Hornets players
St. Michael's Buzzers players
Stanley Cup champions
Toronto Maple Leafs players
Toronto St. Michael's Majors players